Mario Kart DS is a 2005 kart racing video game developed by Nintendo EAD Group No. 1 and published by Nintendo. It was released for the Nintendo DS handheld game console in November 2005 in North America, Europe, and Australia, and on December 8, 2005, in Japan. The game was re-released for the Wii U's Virtual Console in North America and PAL regions in April 2015 and in Japan in May 2016.

The game is the fifth main entry in the Mario Kart series of video games, and the first to be playable via the Nintendo Wi-Fi Connection online service; the service has since been terminated, along with other games playable via the service. Like the other games in the series, Mario Kart DS features characters from the Mario series, and pits them against each other as they race in karts on tracks based on locations in the Mario series.

The game received critical acclaim, receiving an aggregated score of 91% from Metacritic. Praise focused on the game's graphics and gameplay, while criticism targeted its repetitive single-player mode, although its inclusion of Battle and Versus mode for single player were well received. Mario Kart DS received several awards, including Editors' Choice Awards from GameSpot and IGN, G-Phorias Best Handheld Game award, and IGN's Best Racing/Driving Game.

Mario Kart DS was the best-selling game in its first month of release, and also held that position the following month. Overall, Mario Kart DS is the third best-selling game for the Nintendo DS as of March 2016, and the third best-selling Mario Kart game, behind Mario Kart 8 Deluxe and Mario Kart Wii, with 23.6 million units sold worldwide.

Gameplay

Mario Kart DS is a racing game in which the player races in a kart against other racers as one of 12 characters from the Mario series. The player has access to Mario, Luigi, Peach, Toad, Yoshi, Donkey Kong, Wario, and Bowser by default, while Daisy, Dry Bones, Waluigi and R.O.B can be unlocked through gameplay. Only two karts are initially available for each character. An additional kart can be unlocked once some progress is made, and when all 150cc cups are completed with B rank or higher, each character will have access to all 36 karts.

While racing or battling, the Nintendo DS's top screen offers a third-person perspective of the player's kart, while the bottom touchscreen shows the race's current standings, items carried by each racer, and a map of the course. The bottom screen can be toggled to show either an overview of the entire course, or a bird's-eye view of the player's kart and the immediate vicinity, including nearby racers, course hazards, item boxes, and incoming attacks.

Each course features item boxes that the player can drive through to receive a randomly selected item, which the player can use to gain an advantage over other racers. Some items allow the player to attack other racers to slow them down, while other items can be used to speed up the player's own kart to pass other racers more easily.

There are two new items: the Bullet Bill, which transforms the player into a Bullet Bill that autopilots the track; and the Blooper, which squirts ink on all racers ahead of the user, blocking their vision.

Unlike the other versions of Mario Kart, Mario Kart DS allows players to avoid the Spiny Shell (Blue Shell) without any aid from items. This can be done by releasing the mini-turbo right before the Spiny Shell hits the player. This requires precise timing, and it is one of the most difficult skills to acquire in the game. Furthermore, this trick is mainly only possible in 150cc or Mirror Mode. However, it is also possible in 100cc, but only on tracks such as N64 Frappe Snowland, where the terrain is more slippery.

Game modes
The game features five single-player game modes: Grand Prix, Time Trial, Versus, Battle, and Mission. The Grand Prix and Versus modes require that the player choose an engine class from among 50 cc, 100 cc, and 150 cc.

The classes serve as difficulty levels—the higher the engine class, the faster all karts go. In addition, a Mirror mode can be unlocked, in which karts use 150 cc engines and tracks are horizontally reversed (including signs and lettering present in the original orientation).

Grand Prix
In Grand Prix mode, the player competes against seven computer-controlled racers in a series of predetermined courses. Unlike previous Mario Kart games, which featured four cups, Mario Kart DS features eight cups: Mushroom, Flower, Star, Special, Shell, Banana, Leaf, and Lightning, with the latter 4 cups consisting entirely of tracks drawn from the previous entries in the Mario Kart series. In addition, half of the nitro cups and retro cups are unlocked through gameplay.

Each cup has four tracks, for a total of 32. When a cup is completed, a rating will be given based on the times and positions, ranging from E to A, then to 1, 2, or 3 stars. Like in Double Dash, players receive points for each finishing position and that order gets carried over to the next race as the new starting grid.

Time Trial
In Time Trial mode, the player must finish a course as quickly as possible by using 1, 2 or 3 mushrooms (depending on which kart is used). The fastest time is then saved as a ghost, a copy of the player's performance, which the player can race against later.

Versus mode

In Versus mode, the player races on a track of their choosing either against computer-controlled opponents or in local multiplayer. The mode can be played either individually or in teams, which separates racers into a blue team and a red team; in multiplayer, players can control which team they are placed on. In addition, the number of races played and scoring system can also be modified.

Battle mode
Battle mode features two game modes, Balloon Battle and Shine Runners, both which also allow the player to play either individually or in teams.

Balloon Battle
In Balloon Battle, the player must pop the balloons of the opposing players by attacking them, or they can steal balloons by boosting into other karts.

Each participant starts the battle with 1 balloon. These can be re-inflated up to 4 times by either blowing into the microphone or holding the Select button.

In multiplayer, if a human player loses all of their balloons, they are out of the game and turn into a ghost. As a ghost, a player can only place item boxes. If the battle is played in single player, then the match ends and the results are announced when all of the human player's balloons are popped.

Shine Runners
In Shine Runners, the player must collect Shine Sprites (an object from Super Mario Sunshine). The player can attack other racers to take away a Shine Sprite from them, and racers with the fewest Shine Sprites are eliminated from the game over time.

If only CPU players remain, the game ends immediately and the results are randomized.

Mission mode
Mario Kart DS is the first and only game in the series to offer this game mode.

In Mission mode, the player must complete missions, each with objectives that range from collecting coins to attacking enemies.

In each mission, the player controls a pre-specified character. There are seven levels with eight missions in each. After completing each mission, the player's performance is given a grade of stars (three, two, or one) or letters (A, B, or C).

After all the eight missions in a level are complete, the player must complete a boss mission to advance to the next level. Once the first six levels are complete, and the rank of at least one star has been obtained on every mission, the seventh level is unlocked.

Multiplayer modes
The game also features a multiplayer mode, in which 8 players race each other using the DS Download Play feature for consoles without a cartridge or a multi-card wireless LAN connection. Available to players are Versus mode (only the Mushroom and Shell cup's levels can be played in a DS Download Play lobby) and the two Battle modes (only three available courses out of six). Players with no cartridges have to play as Shy Guy, a character unavailable for individual use, and are forced to use a standard kart which is colored along with the randomly-selected color of the Shy Guy.

Until its discontinuation on May 20, 2014, Mario Kart DS supported online play via the Nintendo Wi-Fi Connection, in which up to 4 players could play together. When playing online, participants could only race against each other; Battle mode was never available when playing via an online connection. These features are not available in the Wii U Virtual Console version because the multiplayer features have not been emulated.

Development
Nintendo announced on May 11, 2004, that they planned to release a Mario Kart game for the Nintendo DS, releasing some gameplay video footage at the same time. The company offered the game for the public to play for the first time at the 2005 Game Developers Conference, where the game's wireless feature was also showcased. Mario Kart DS was produced by Hideki Konno. The game runs at a consistent 60 frames per second and uses full 3D characters and environments.

Mario Kart DS is the first Mario Kart iteration to support online play. Konno remarked that although both Mario Kart DS and the Halo series feature online play, he noted that most of the people who use the feature in Halo games were "hardcore gamers". With Mario Kart DS, Konno wanted "everyone to go online, and the technology and time is right for that to happen". Continuing with the tradition of introducing a new gameplay mechanic in each Mario Kart game, Mario Kart DS is the first in the series to support up to eight players at the same time with game cartridges. New to the series, the game also includes a single-player Battle Mode, which does not require that there be at least two human participants. As the first Mario Kart game for the Nintendo DS, the developers tested several features that took advantage of the device's bottom touchscreen. They considered letting players place items anywhere on the track instead of just behind their kart. However, the developers found it too confusing because the game already had too many distractions, making it difficult to control where to place items while racing.

In Mario Kart DS, a kart is able to draft behind another kart to gain a speed boost momentarily, a feature that was also previously used in the 1996 video game Mario Kart 64. Mario Kart DS places a stronger focus on the feature and once again provides a visual cue when a kart is drafting. In an interview, Konno noted that they included tracks from previous Mario Kart games into Mario Kart DS so that players who played the original Super Mario Kart on the Super Nintendo Entertainment System would feel more familiar with the DS iteration of the series.

The game's soundtrack is composed by Mario Kart: Double Dash composer Shinobu Tanaka with voices by Charles Martinet as Mario, Luigi, Wario, and Waluigi, Jen Taylor as Princess Peach and Toad, Kazumi Totaka as Yoshi, Deanna Mustard as Daisy, Takashi Nagasako as Donkey Kong, and Scott Burns as Bowser.

Reception

Mario Kart DS was released by Nintendo for the Nintendo DS in North America on November 14, 2005, in Australia on November 17, 2005, in Europe in November 2005, and in Japan on December 8, 2005. Nintendo later revealed that Mario Kart DS would also be sold bundled with a new red-colored Nintendo DS starting on November 28, 2005, along with "a checkered-flag wrist strap, and racing-inspired decals to customize new red handheld". The game was released to critical acclaim; it holds an aggregated score of 91% on Metacritic. Praise focused on the game's graphics and gameplay, while criticism targeted its repetitive single-player mode. Mario Kart DS received Editors' Choice awards from GameSpot and IGN. The game was nominated by GameSpot for several Best of 2005 awards, including Best Multiplayer Game, Best Driving Game, and Best DS Game, winning the last one. The game received G-Phorias Best Handheld Game award. IGN gave the game the awards for Best Racing/Driving Game.

Several reviews praised the game for living up to the standards set by its predecessors. Finding the game's online shortcomings annoying, GameSpy still believed that the single-player mode and local wireless gameplay more than made up for them. Nintendo World Report noticed that "the best features of past Mario Kart games are back" and work well with the new features in Mario Kart DS, calling the result "the most impressive game to ever hit the Nintendo DS and also the best game in the Mario Kart series". X-Play shared this sentiment, and remarked that the game shattered all of its expectations, making it the "best kart racing game ever released—handheld or otherwise". GameZone also believed that Mario Kart DS "lives up to its legacy" with its inventive courses, "stellar" multiplayer, and "more replay value than any other racer in its class". Alejandro K. Brown of CBS News appreciated the game's unique use of Nintendo DS features, such as its microphone and wireless connectivity. GamesRadar named Mario Kart DS the best DS game of all time, beating out Pokémon Black and White (2nd) and Grand Theft Auto: Chinatown Wars (3rd).

Finding it hard to imagine how Nintendo could make a Mario Kart game better than Mario Kart DS, IGN lauded Mario Kart DSs gameplay and depth in its design. GameSpot called the game a "significant step forward" for the Mario Kart series, partly because it is the first in the series to feature online play. Game Revolution remarked that the game "goes the distance" with its single-player and multiplayer modes. 1Up.com complimented the "surprisingly compelling package", describing it as a "portable racing game on par with anything ever to appear on a console". Video game magazine GamePro was pleased with the variety of racers, courses, modes, and multiplayer options offered, toting the game as a "must play" for any Nintendo fan and a requisite for any Nintendo DS owner to purchase. Computer and Video Games described Mario Kart DS as the "most complete" Mario Kart game, despite a few graphical shortcomings. Eurogamer enjoyed the game's multiplayer mode, calling it "genuinely practical to play with other people". British publication GamesTM criticized the game for being simply a "polishing of the Mario Kart concept and little else".

The game was the first for the Nintendo DS to take advantage of the console's Nintendo Wi-Fi Connection feature. By the end of its debut week in the United States, 112,000 people purchased the game, of which 52,000 of them had logged onto Nintendo Wi-Fi Connection to play against other people over the Internet. Mario Kart DS was the best-selling handheld game in its debut month of November 2005 in the United States. It was the 10th best-selling game of 2008, and the best-selling Nintendo DS game of that year. In Japan, the game sold 224,411 copies in its first week. Mario Kart DS sold 3,112,363 units as of July 2008, and 3,224,996 copies as of January 2009, making it the sixth best-selling game for the Nintendo DS since the console's release. In the United States, it sold 910,000 copies and earned $31 million by August 2006. During the period between January 2000 and August 2006, it was the 23rd highest-selling game launched for the Game Boy Advance, Nintendo DS, or PlayStation Portable in that country. In 2009, Official Nintendo Magazine ranked the game 26th on a list of greatest Nintendo games. As of March 2016, Mario Kart DS has sold 23.6 million units worldwide.

Notes

References

External links

2005 video games
Products and services discontinued in 2014
DS
Multiplayer online games
Inactive multiplayer online games
Nintendo DS games
Nintendo Entertainment Analysis and Development games
Nintendo Wi-Fi Connection games
Mario racing games
Video games developed in Japan
Virtual Console games
Virtual Console games for Wii U
Multiplayer and single-player video games

de:Mario Kart#Mario Kart DS (Nintendo DS)